Yves Lacoste (born 7 September 1929) is a French geographer and geopolitician. He was born in  Fes, Morocco.

Life
In 1976 he established the French geopolitical journal Hérodote and published a work that shook the French academy, La Géographie ça sert d'abord à faire la guerre. Its central thesis was that "geography was a form of strategic and political knowledge, central to the military strategy and the exercise of political power". Lacoste had earlier earned international renown in 1972 during the Vietnam War by publishing a spatial forensics analysis of the US bombing campaign of the Red River Delta. He agreed with claims from the North Vietnamese government that the US was deliberately targeting the hydrological infrastructure of the river in an attempt to trigger flooding and cause mass civilian casualties, which it called a war crime.

He is currently co-editor of Hérodote with Beatrice Giblin and the head of the French Institute of Geopolitics (Institut Français de Géopolitique) at the University of Paris VIII.

Understanding of geopolitics
Lacoste played a key role in reviving the word geopolitics in the French and English languages. The word had been tarnished by its association with the Nazi régime because of German geopolitician Karl Haushofer. Focussing on spatial dimensions of political affairs Lacoste defines geopolitics as the study of power rivalries over territory carried out on different levels of analysis: global, continental, national, regional or even local.

In an earlier work, La Géographie du sous-développement, Lacoste had suggested a spatial explanation of underdevelopment.

Writings
Les Pays sous-développés (1959)
Géographie du sous-développement (1965)
Ibn Khaldoun - Naissance de l'histoire du Tiers-Monde (1965)
La Géographie ça sert d'abord à faire la guerre (1976) 
Contre les anti-tiersmondistes et contre certains tiersmondistes (1985)
Géopolitique des régions françaises (1986)
vol 1: La France septentrionale
vol 2: La Façade atlantique
vol 3: La France du sud-est
Dictionnaire de Géopolitique (1993) 
Dictionnaire géopolitique des États (1994) 
La Légende de la terre (1996) 
Vive la Nation - Destin d'une idée géopolitique (1998) 
L'Eau des hommes (2002) 
De la Géopolitique aux Paysages. Dictionnaire de la Géographie (2003) 
Maghreb, peuple et civilisation (2004) 
Géopolitique. La longue histoire d'aujourd'hui (2006) 
L'Eau dans le monde : les batailles pour la vie (2006) 
Géopolitique de la Méditerranée (2006)

References

French geographers
Geopoliticians
People from Fez, Morocco
1929 births
Living people
Recipients of the Vautrin Lud International Geography Prize
People of the Algerian War
Winners of the Prix Broquette-Gonin (literature)